Direct Hit is a 1994 direct-to-video action film starring William Forsythe and directed by Joseph Merhi.

Plot
After informing his CIA handlers that his next hit will be his last, John Hatch (Forsythe) discovers that his target isn't a criminal at all. Refusing to take the woman out, Hatch instead takes it upon himself to protect her and expose the web of corruption at work.

Cast
William Forsythe as Hatch
Jo Champa as Savannah
Richard Norton as Rogers
John Aprea as Terry Daniels
George Segal as James Tronson
Juliet Landau as Shelly
Steve Garvey as Reporter
Mel Novak as Kovar
David St. James as Technician

References

External links

1994 films
1994 action films
American action films
Films directed by Joseph Merhi
1990s English-language films
1990s American films